Filin is a rural locality (a khutor) in Popovskoye Rural Settlement, Kumylzhensky District, Volgograd Oblast, Russia. The population was 419 as of 2010. There are 10 streets.

Geography 
Filin is located in forest steppe, on Khopyorsko-Buzulukskaya Plain, 47 km northwest of Kumylzhenskaya (the district's administrative centre) by road. Podkovsky is the nearest rural locality.

References 

Rural localities in Kumylzhensky District